HD 10647 b, also catalogued as q1 Eridani b, is an extrasolar planet approximately 57 light-years away in the constellation of Eridanus (the River).  The planet is a mid-Jovian that orbits 103% farther from the star than Earth to the Sun. It takes about 33 months to orbit with semi-amplitude of 17.9 m/s.

See also
 51 Pegasi b
 91 Aquarii b
 109 Piscium b
 Epsilon Eridani b

References

External links

Eridanus (constellation)
Exoplanets discovered in 2003
Giant planets
Exoplanets detected by radial velocity

de:HD 10647 b